Bows & Arrows may refer to:
Bows & Arrows (album), a 2015 album by Cindy Morgan
Bows + Arrows, a 2004 album by The Walkmen
"Bows & Arrows", a song by Kaiser Chiefs from the album Education, Education, Education & War

See also
Bow and arrow, a projectile weapon system